Korean comedy is the art of comedy, either enacted on stage, or within other media forms in the Korean language. It is not limited by country, so long as the actor has Korean roots.

Comedy in South Korea
In South Korea, most comedy is expressed through television programs, such as Gag Concert, or in the movies. It is still physically driven. Most newspapers have a political cartoonist who will also heighten attention to current events with comic illustrations.

Comedy in North Korea
In North Korea, Pyongyang Broadcasting Corporation in late May 2005, has revived comic folk tales for political commentary, in attempting to satirize American society, and political jockeying for power by using the a form known as manp'il, or "comic notes" in a short acted dialogue using folkish humour and animal metaphors.

Famous Korean comedians 

 Haha
Jang Dong-min
Jang Do-yeon
 Jee Seok-jin
 Jeon So-min
 Jeong Hyeong-don
 Jeong Jun-ha
 Jo Se-ho
 Kang Ho-dong
 Lee Guk-joo
 Kim Gu-ra
 Kim Jun-ho
 Kim Jong-kook
 Kim Jong-min
Kim Jun-hyun
Kim Young-chul
 Lee Kwang-soo
Lee Kyung-gyu
 Lee Su-geun
 Lee Hyuk-jae
Lee Hwi-jae
 Park Myeong-su
 Park Na-rae
 Park Sang-myun 
Park Soo-hong
 Park Jun-gyu
 Noh Hong-chul
 Shin Bong-sun
Shin Dong-yup
 Shin Jung-hwan
 Song Ji-hyo
 Yang Sang-guk
 Yang Se-chan
 Yang Se-hyung
 Yoo Jae-suk
Yoo Sang-moo
 Kim Byung-man
 Kim Shin-young

See also
It's So Funny

See also
Korean art
Korean culture
Contemporary culture of South Korea
Infinite Challenge
Running Man (South Korean TV series)

External links
The Foul King, a wrestling comedy
PBS airs successful radio satire in manp'il, or "comic notes" form